George Edmund Holt (February 15, 1881 in Moline, Illinois – October 16, 1950 in San Diego, California) was an American journalist. In Morocco, he covered the defeat and abdication of Sultan Abd-el-Aziz for the Associated Press. He also met Raisuli. He was appointed Consul-General for the United States in Morocco.

He also wrote short stories for magazines such as Collier's. and contributed both fiction and non-fiction to Adventure

He resided in San Diego from 1922 until his death.

Books

Non fiction
Morocco the piquant, or, Life in sunset land

Fiction
By Favour of Allah (1926) 
The Decree of Allah (Black Dog Books, 2015)

See also
 Adventurers' Club of New York

References

American male journalists
American diplomats
Pulp fiction writers
1881 births
1950 deaths
American expatriates in Morocco